Khana Junction is a railway station in Bardhaman Sadar North subdivision of Purba Bardhaman district in the Indian state of West Bengal.

History
During the middle of the nineteenth century,  Carr, Tagore and Company transported coal from Narayankuri ghat on the Damodar River to Kolkata, then known as Calcutta. However, as the flow of water in the river was inconsistent, supplies were irregular. In order to capture the lucrative coal transport business, East Indian Railway, extended the railway track that had been laid between Kolkata and Hooghly to Raniganj in 1855.

Construction of what was then considered to be the Howrah–Delhi main line was started in 1859, when the Khana Junction-Rajmahal line was built. In 1866 Kolkata –and Delhi were directly linked. Initially, it was called the chord line. However, as it attracted more traffic it was designated the main line and the original line, operating between Khana Junction and Kiul Junction, became the Sahibganj loop.

References

Railway stations in Purba Bardhaman district
Railway junction stations in West Bengal
Howrah railway division
Railway stations in India opened in 1854
1854 establishments in India